Beauce-Sartigan is a regional county municipality in the Chaudière-Appalaches region of Quebec, Canada.  The county seat is Saint-Georges.

The Chaudière River flows through it.  It shares its eastern border with Maine, United States.

The name of the RCM is linked to the historical region of which it is part, Beauce. Sartigan is a distortion of Mechatigan (or Msakkikhan), the name given to the Chaudière River by the native Abenakis.

Subdivisions
There are 16 subdivisions within the RCM:

Cities & Towns (1)
 Saint-Georges

Municipalities (9)
 Saint-Benoît-Labre
 Saint-Côme–Linière
 Saint-Éphrem-de-Beauce
 Saint-Évariste-de-Forsyth
 Saint-Gédéon-de-Beauce
 Saint-Honoré-de-Shenley
 Saint-Philibert
 Saint-Simon-les-Mines
 Saint-Théophile

Parishes (4)
 Notre-Dame-des-Pins
 Saint-Hilaire-de-Dorset
 Saint-Martin
 Saint-René

Villages (2)
 Lac-Poulin
 La Guadeloupe

Demographics

Ethnicity
Source: 2016 Census 
 96.2% White
 2.8% Aboriginal
 1.0% Visible Minority

Transportation
Highways and numbered routes that run through the municipality, including external routes that start or finish at the county border:

 Autoroutes
 

 Principal Highways
 
 

 Secondary Highways
 
 
 
 

 External Routes

Attractions
 Centre d'art de Saint-Georges (Saint-Georges)
 Centre Marie-Fitzbach (Saint-Georges)
 Magasin général Honoré Grégoire (Saint-Honoré-de-Shenley)
 Musée d'autos antiques Victor-Bélanger (Saint-Côme–Linière)
 Pont couvert Perreault (1928) (Notre-Dame-des-Pins)
 Saint-Georges Airport (Saint-Georges)
 Saint-Paul-de-Cumberland Church (1847) (Saint-Simon-les-Mines)
 Village miniature Baillargeon (Saint-Georges)

See also
 List of regional county municipalities and equivalent territories in Quebec
 Beauce, Quebec

References

Commission de toponymie du Québec

 
Regional county municipalities in Chaudière-Appalaches
Census divisions of Quebec
Saint-Georges, Quebec